Rick Fuson (born 1953) is the chief operating officer and president of the Indiana Pacers since 2014. Fuson is also a chairman of the Indiana Sports Corp board of directors.

Fuson has been awarded the Indianapolis Business Journals "Who's Who in Hospitality", "Who's Who in Sports" and "40 Under 40" (1993), and the Indianapolis Ambassadors 1988 Community Service Award.

Fuson is a member of the International Association of Assembly Managers, active with the Indianapolis Fellowship of Christian Athletes, chairman of the board for Indiana Sports Corp, and serves on the board of directors for Indianapolis Downtown, Greater Indianapolis Chamber of Commerce, Indiana Repertory Theatre, Indianapolis Urban League and Visit Indy.

He and his wife, Karen, who manages 60 newspapers for Gannett, reside in Brown County, Indiana. They have three children and two grandchildren.

Early life and career 
Rick's father, Wayne Fuson Sr., was the sports editor for the Indianapolis News. His parents lived in Terre Haute and Clay County before relocating to Indianapolis and giving birth to Rick.

In 1971, Fuson graduated from Arlington High School. Fuson earned his degree in political science at Indiana University in 1975. While attending college, he played on the Indiana Hoosiers football team for two years under John Pont. After graduating from IU, Fuson moved to California and worked on a Lilly Endowment grant. Fuson went back to Indiana and sold bulldozers for McAllister Machinery Company for nearly ten years. His dad linked his up with Larry Conrad, the former secretary of state of Indiana and spokesperson for the Simon family (Herbert Simon and Melvin Simon) who bought the Pacers in the 1983-84 season. Bob Salyers (former GM and president of the Pacers) hired him.

Indiana Pacers 
Fuson began working for the Pacers organization in 1984 as director of special events. Fuson oversaw the development and move to the Conseco Fieldhouse.

Fuson worked for Donnie Walsh and Jim Morris. Fuson was promoted to COO/president in 2014 when Morris changed position to the vice chairman role. CEO Herb Simon said "Rick Fuson over many years has shown himself to be a brilliant manager and trusted steward of Pacers Sports & Entertainment."

Fuson has been influential in orchestrating events across the city, including those at Gainbridge Fieldhouse, Market Square Arena, and RCA Dome. He was instrumental in hosting the 1985 NBA All-Star Game, 2012 Super Bowl, 1991/97/2000/06/10 NCAA Final Four, 2002/04/06/08/09/10/11 Big Ten Basketball tournament, 2004 World Swimming Championships, 2002 FIBA World Basketball Championships, 1987 Pan American Games, 1991 World Gymnastics Championships, 1988 Indianapolis Zoo, White River Park State Games, and 2001 World Police & Fire Games.

Fuson and the Pacers will be hosting the 2024 NBA All-Star Game for the first time since 1985. NBA Commissioner Adam Silver said, “I want to thank Herb Simon, Steve Simon, Rick Fuson and the entire Pacers organization."

See also 
List of National Basketball Association team presidents

References

Living people
National Basketball Association executives
1953 births